Grace Gaustad is a Los Angeles-based singer and songwriter. Gaustad rose to prominence in 2016 when they launched a YouTube channel with their performance of Hozier's "Take Me to Church" which received more than 25 million views.

Welcome to Jupiter 1.0, their second EP, was released in 2021.

Gaustad released their debut album, BLKBX: wht r u hding, in August 2021. The album features connections with Gaustad's charity, the BLKBX Project and addresses Grace's experiences with bullying and growing up as part of the LGBTQ+ community.

"93 Days", one of BLKBX's singles, featured actor Mariska Hargitay in its music video, as did GAGA off their 2022 album, PILLBX.

Gaustad's 2022 song Hero was included in Netflix's Rescued by Ruby.

In June of 2022, Gaustad began releasing songs off their second album, "PILLBX: whts ur fantasy". The November 2022 single "Like a Person," released early following the Colorado Springs nightclub shooting, is about Gaustad's experience as a member of the LGBTQ+ community. The music video features trans activist and influencer Dylan Mulvaney. 

Grace uses they/them pronouns.

Discography

Albums
BLKBX: wht r u hding (2021, self release)
PILLBX:whts ur fantasy? (2022)

Singles and EPs
Walk (single, 2017)
Take Me to Church (single, 2018)
HUMAN (EP, 2019, Red Light Management)
No You to Me (single, 2021)
Freedom (single, 2021)
Welcome to Jupiter 1.0 (EP, 2021)
Out of Time (single, 2021)
PILLBX (single, 2022)
GAGA (single, 2022)

References

External links

American women singer-songwriters
American LGBT singers
21st-century American singers
Living people
2001 births